DUL may refer to:
 Dialup Users List
 DOLCE+DnS-Ultralite - A lighter OWL axiomatization of DOLCE and DnS upper ontologies.
 Dullingham railway station

See also
 Dul (disambiguation)